James Jonathon Wilby (born 20 February 1958) is an English actor.

Early life and education
Wilby was born in Rangoon, Burma to a corporate executive father. He was educated at Terrington Hall School, North Yorkshire and Sedbergh School in Cumbria (prior to 1974 in West Riding of Yorkshire), and from there went on to study for a degree in Mathematics at Grey College, University of Durham, and then at the Royal Academy of Dramatic Art.

Career
Wilby's first appearance on screen was in the Oxford Film Company 1982 production Privileged alongside Hugh Grant. He is known to an international audience for roles in Maurice (1987), for which he received Venice Film Festival's Best Actor award with co-star Hugh Grant. He then starred in A Handful of Dust (1988), for which he won the Bari Film Festival Best Actor award. Then came A Tale of Two Cities (1989), Howards End (1992), the critically acclaimed Regeneration (1997), Ismail Merchant's Cotton Mary (1999), Gosford Park (2001) and Alain Robbe-Grillet's C'est Gradiva qui vous appelle (2006) co-starring Arielle Dombasle which premiered at the Venice Film Festival.

On stage, he starred in the 1995 revival of John Osborne's A Patriot for Me by the Royal Shakespeare Company at the Barbican Theatre. He then appeared in a production of Helping Harry at the Jermyn Street Theatre in 2001; and in 2004 as the title character in a run of Don Juan at the Lyric Theatre. He has also starred in On Emotion (2008) at the Soho Theatre; The Consultant (2011) by Neil Fleming and the Hydrocracker Theatre Company at Theatre503 in London; and in tours of Terence Rattigan's Less Than Kind (2012) and Patrick Hamilton's Gaslight (2019).

Personal life
He is married to Shana Louise and has four children.

From 1994 to 2015, Wilby owned The Laines, an 18th-century country house in Plumpton, East Sussex, near Lewes. It was the childhood home of Camilla, Queen Consort.

Filmography

Film

Television

See also
List of British actors
List of Durham University people
List of RADA alumni

References

External links

 
 New York Times biography 
 Hollywood.com biography

Interviews
From The Guardian (2002)
From The Telegraph (2004)
From The Telegraph (2005)

1958 births
20th-century English male actors
21st-century English male actors
Alumni of Grey College, Durham
Alumni of RADA
English male film actors
English male stage actors
English male television actors
Living people
People educated at Sedbergh School
Outstanding Performance by a Cast in a Motion Picture Screen Actors Guild Award winners
People from Yangon
Volpi Cup for Best Actor winners
Burmese emigrants to the United Kingdom